Betty Boothroyd, Baroness Boothroyd  (8 October 1929 – 26 February 2023) was a British politician who served as a member of Parliament (MP) for West Bromwich and West Bromwich West from 1973 to 2000. A member of the Labour Party, she served as Speaker of the House of Commons from 1992 to 2000. She was the first woman to have served as Speaker. By tradition, Boothroyd later sat as a crossbench peer in the House of Lords.

Early life
Boothroyd was born in Dewsbury, Yorkshire, in 1929, the only child of Ben Archibald Boothroyd (1886–1948) and his second wife Mary (née Butterfield, 1901–1982), both textile workers. She was educated at council schools and went on to study at Dewsbury College of Commerce and Art (now Kirklees College). From 1946 to 1952, she worked as a dancer, as a member of the Tiller Girls dancing troupe, briefly appearing at the London Palladium. A foot infection, however, brought an end to her dancing career, and she chose to enter politics.

During the mid-to-late 1950s, Boothroyd worked as secretary to Labour MPs Barbara Castle and Geoffrey de Freitas. In 1960, she travelled to the United States to see the Kennedy campaign. She subsequently began work in Washington D.C. as a legislative assistant for an American Congressman, Silvio Conte, between 1960 and 1962. When she returned to London, she continued her work as a secretary and political assistant to various senior Labour politicians such as Under-Secretary of State for Foreign Affairs Harry Walston. In 1965, she was elected to a seat on Hammersmith Borough Council, in Gibbs Green ward, where she remained until 1968.

Member of Parliament
Running for the Labour Party, Boothroyd contested several seats – Leicester South East in 1957, Peterborough in 1959, Nelson and Colne in 1968, and Rossendale in 1970 – before being elected Member of Parliament (MP) for West Bromwich in a by-election in 1973.

In 1974, Boothroyd was appointed an assistant Government Whip, and she was a Member of the European Parliament (MEP) from 1975 to 1977. In 1979, she became a member of the Select committee on Foreign Affairs, until 1981, and of the Speaker's Panel of Chairmen, until 1 January 2000. She was also a member of the Labour Party National Executive Committee (NEC) from 1981 to 1987, and the House of Commons Commission from 1983 to 1987.

Deputy Speaker and Speaker

 
In 1987, following the general election that year, Boothroyd became a Deputy Speaker under the Speaker Bernard Weatherill. Serving in this role for five years, she was only the second female Deputy Speaker in British history after Betty Harvie Anderson. In 1992 she was elected Speaker, becoming the first woman ever to hold the position. There was debate about whether Boothroyd should wear the traditional Speaker's Wig upon her election. She chose not to but also stated that any subsequent Speakers would be free to choose to wear the wig; none have since done so. There was also debate as to how she should be addressed as Speaker, to which Boothroyd answered: "Call me Madam [Speaker]".

In 1993, the Government won a vote on the Social Chapter of the Maastricht Treaty due to her casting vote (exercised in accordance with Speaker Denison's rule). However, it was subsequently discovered that her casting vote was not required, as the votes had been miscounted, and the Government had won by one vote. She was keen to get young people interested in politics, and in the 1990s made an appearance as a special guest on the BBC's Saturday morning children's programme Live & Kicking. Her signature catchphrase in closing Prime Minister's Questions each week was "Time's up!"

On 12 July 2000, following Prime Minister's Questions, Boothroyd declared to the House of Commons that she planned to resign as Speaker after the summer recess. Tony Blair, then Prime Minister, paid tribute to her as "something of a national institution". Blair's predecessor, John Major, described her as an "outstanding Speaker". She resigned as Speaker and as an MP by accepting an appointment to the position of Crown Steward and Bailiff of the Chiltern Hundreds on 23 October 2000.

Life peerage and later activity
Boothroyd was awarded an Honorary Doctor of Civil Law (Hon DCL) by the City University London in 1993. Boothroyd was chancellor of the Open University from 1994 until October 2006 and donated some of her personal papers to the University's archives. In March 1995, she was also awarded an honorary degree from the Open University as Doctor of the University (DUniv). In 1999 she was made an Honorary Fellow of St Hugh's College, Oxford. Two portraits of Boothroyd have been part of the parliamentary art collection since 1994 and 1999, respectively.

On 15 January 2001, she was created a life peer, taking as her title Baroness Boothroyd of Sandwell in the County of West Midlands. Her autobiography was published in the same year. In April 2005, she was appointed to the Order of Merit (OM), an honour in the personal gift of the Queen.

Boothroyd was made an Honorary Fellow of the Society of Light and Lighting (Hon. FSLL) in 2009, and she was an Honorary Fellow of St Hugh's College, Oxford, and St Edmund's College, Cambridge. Boothroyd was Patron of the Jo Richardson Community School in Dagenham, East London, as well as being President of NBFA Assisting the Elderly. She was also, for a period, Vice President of the Industry and Parliament Trust.

In January 2011, Boothroyd posited that Deputy Prime Minister Nick Clegg's plans for some members of the upper house to be directly elected could leave Britain in constitutional disarray: "It is wantonly destructive. It is destruction that hasn't been thought through properly." Boothroyd said she was concerned that an elected Lords would rival the Commons, risking power-struggles between the two.

Personal life and death
Boothroyd never married nor had any children. Boothroyd took up paragliding while on holiday in Cyprus in her 60s. She described the hobby as both "lovely and peaceful" and "exhilarating". In April 1995, whilst on holiday in Morocco, Boothroyd became trapped in the Atlas Mountains in the country's biggest storm in 20 years. Her vehicle was immobilised by a landslide; she and a group of hikers walked through mud and rubble for nine hours, looking for help. They were eventually rescued.

Boothroyd died at Addenbrooke's Hospital in Cambridge on 26 February 2023, at the age of 93. Her death was announced the following day by 
Sir Lindsay Hoyle, Speaker of the House.

Arms

Honorary degrees
Boothroyd received at least eight honorary degrees in recognition of her political career, including:
 6 December 1993: Doctor of Civil Law (DCL) from City, University of London 
 1994: Doctor of Letters (D.Litt.) from the University of Cambridge 
 18 March 1995: Doctor of the University (D.Univ.) from the Open University
 1995: Doctor of Civil Law (DCL) from the University of Oxford
 26 June 2003:  Doctor of Laws (LL.D.) from the University of St Andrews

Boothroyd was additionally made an Honorary Fellow of Newnham College, Cambridge, in 1994.

Publications

References

External links

 Archives Hub – Papers of Betty Boothroyd (Biography)
 Brief biography by BBC News Online, October 2000
 
 
 

1929 births
2023 deaths
20th-century English women politicians
20th-century women MEPs for the United Kingdom
21st-century English women politicians
British female dancers
Chancellors of the Open University
Crossbench life peers
English autobiographers
English expatriates in the United States
Fellows of St Hugh's College, Oxford
Female members of the Parliament of the United Kingdom for English constituencies
GMB (trade union)-sponsored MPs
Honorary Fellows of Newnham College, Cambridge
Labour Party (UK) MEPs
Labour Party (UK) MPs for English constituencies
Life peeresses created by Elizabeth II
MEPs for the United Kingdom 1973–1979
Members of the Order of Merit
Members of the Privy Council of the United Kingdom
People associated with City, University of London
People associated with the Open University
People associated with the University of Cambridge
People associated with the University of Oxford
People associated with the University of St Andrews
People from Dewsbury
Speakers of the House of Commons of the United Kingdom
UK MPs 1970–1974
UK MPs 1974
UK MPs 1974–1979
UK MPs 1979–1983
UK MPs 1983–1987
UK MPs 1987–1992
UK MPs 1992–1997
UK MPs 1997–2001
United States congressional aides
Women autobiographers
Women legislative deputy speakers
Women legislative speakers